Yevhen Zhovtyak (b. 19 March 1961, Rudnyky, Sniatyn Raion) is a Ukrainian politician.

In 1984 he graduated Kharkiv Aviation Institute (KhAI) as a mechanical engineer. After graduation Zhovtyak worked as a design engineer at the Zhulyany Engineering Factory in Vyshneve, specializing production of missiles for the Soviet S-300 missile system.

In 1993 Zhovtyak received a graduate degree in state administration from the Cabinet of Ministers of Ukraine Institute of State Administration and Self-Government. While studying in the institute, in 1992-1994 he also worked as a state official at the Kyiv-Stiatoshyn Raion administration and later as a specialist for some office support departments of the Cabinet of Ministers of Ukraine.

He was a member of the Ukrainian parliament in 1994-2005 (2nd, 3rd, and 4th convocations). Being a politician of People's Movement of Ukraine and Ukrainian People's Party, Zhovtyak was elected from his constituency in Kyiv Oblast (Kyiv-Sviatoshyn Raion). While being a member of parliament, in 1999 he also received a law degree from the Yaroslav Mudryi National Law University in Kharkiv. 

Following the so-called Orange Revolution in Ukraine, in 2005-2006 he served as a Governor of Kyiv Oblast.

References

External links 
 Yevhen Zhovtyak at the Official Ukraine Today portal
 Members. Ukrainian Platform "Sobor" website.
 Personal blog. Yevhen Zhovtyak at blogspot

1961 births
Living people
People from Ivano-Frankivsk Oblast
Ukrainian People's Party politicians
Republican Platform politicians
People's Movement of Ukraine politicians
Governors of Kyiv Oblast
Fourth convocation members of the Verkhovna Rada
Third convocation members of the Verkhovna Rada
Second convocation members of the Verkhovna Rada
National Aerospace University – Kharkiv Aviation Institute alumni
Yaroslav Mudryi National Law University alumni